The All-ECAC Hockey Teams are composed of players at all positions from teams that are members of ECAC Hockey, an NCAA Division I hockey-only conference. Each year, from 1961–62 onward, at the conclusion of the ECAC Hockey regular season the head coaches of each member team vote for players to be placed on each all-conference team. The First Team and Second Team have been named in each ECAC Hockey season with a Third team added in 2005–06; a Rookie Team was added starting in 1987–88.

The all-conference teams are composed of one goaltender, two defensemen and three forwards. If a tie occurred for the final selection at any position, both players were included as part of the greater all-conference team; if a tie resulted in an increase in the number of superior all-stars, the inferior team would not be reduced in number (as happened in 1965–66 and 1983–84) until 2005–06, after which the inferior team will be reduced accordingly (as happened in 2006–07). Players may only appear once per year on any of the first, second, or third teams but freshman may appear on both the rookie team and one of the other all-conference teams. Jack Leetch is so far the only player to appear on the All-Star teams in two different positions (forward and defense).

In the first three years ECAC Hockey's all-conference teams were double in size for goaltenders and defensemen and triple for forwards, reflecting the 28-29 teams in the conference. After the 1963–64 season the ECAC split their conference into Division I and NCAA Division III classifications and subsequently reduced the team size to a standard (and current) format.

Due to two thirds of league members cancelling their seasons due to the COVID-19 pandemic, ECAC Hockey did not name a second- or third-team all-conference in 2020–21.

All-conference teams

First Team

1960s

1970s

1980s

1990s

2000s

2010s

2020s

First Team players by school

Current members

Former members

Multiple appearances

Second Team

1960s

1970s

1980s

1990s

2000s

2010s

2020s

Second Team players by school

Current members

Former members

Multiple appearances

Third Team

2000s

2010s

2020s

Third Team players by school

Multiple appearances

Rookie Team

1980s

1990s

2000s

2010s

2020s

Rookie Team players by school

See also
ECAC Hockey Awards

References

External links
ECAC Awards and Honors
ECAC First All-Star Team (Incomplete)
ECAC Second All-Star Team (Incomplete)
ECAC Third All-Star Team (Incomplete)
ECAC All-Rookie Team (Incomplete)

College ice hockey trophies and awards in the United States